Nicolás Gómez may refer to:

 Nicolás Gómez (footballer, born June 1992), Uruguayan defender
 Nicolás Gómez (footballer, born December 1992), Argentine midfielder
 Nicolás Gómez (footballer, born 1996), Argentine midfielder